Lunan is a hamlet in Angus, Scotland, in the parish of the same name,  south of Montrose. The hamlet overlooks Lunan Bay, which is itself also a hamlet, at the mouth of the Lunan Water. A 16th-century priest of Lunan church, which is in the hamlet of Lunan Bay, Walter Mill, was one of the last Scottish Protestant martyrs to be burned at St. Andrews. The church itself was rebuilt in 1844.

Lunan was previously served by Lunan Bay railway station. Although the station has now closed, the line remains open as the Dundee–Aberdeen line.

References

Sources
Lunan in the Gazetteer for Scotland.

Villages in Angus, Scotland